Antoine Pevsner (12 April 1962) was a Russian-born sculptor and the older brother of Alexii Pevsner and Naum Gabo. Both Antoine and Naum are considered pioneers of twentieth-century sculpture.

Biography 

Pevsner was born as Natan Borisovich Pevzner in Oryol, Russian Empire, into a Jewish family. Among the originators of and having coined the term, Constructivism, and pioneers of Kinetic Art, Pevsner and his brother Naum Gabo discovered a new use for metals and welding and made a new marriage of art and mathematics. Pevsner said: "Art must be inspiration controlled by mathematics. I have a need for peace, symphony, orchestration." He was one of the first to use the blowtorch in sculpture, welding copper rods onto sculptural forms and along with his brother, Naum, he issued the Realist Manifesto in 1920.

He left the Soviet Union in 1923 and moved to Paris, where he would live for the rest of his life. 

Among the honors he received were a retrospective at the Museum of Modern Art in Paris (1956-7) and the Legion of Honour (1961).

Pevsner is buried in Paris.

References

External links 
 

1886 births
1962 deaths
People from Klimavichy
People from Klimovichskiy Uyezd
Belarusian Jews
Soviet sculptors
Modern sculptors
Jewish sculptors
Russian avant-garde
Constructivism (art)
Soviet emigrants to the United States
Burials at Sainte-Geneviève-des-Bois Russian Cemetery
20th-century French sculptors
French male sculptors

Recipients of the Legion of Honour